The Saghmosavank (lit. "monastery of the Psalms") is a 13th-century Armenian monastic complex located in the village of Saghmosavan in the Aragatsotn Province of Armenia. Like the Hovhannavank monastery which is five kilometers south, Saghmosavank is situated atop the precipitous gorge carved by the Kasagh river. Their silhouettes dominate the adjacent villages and rise sharp against the background of the mountains crowned by Mount Aragats.

The main structures of the monasteries erected by Prince Vache Vachutyan—the Church of Zion in Saghmosavank (1215) and the Church of Karapet in Hovhannavank (1216-1221)—belong to the same type of cross-winged domed structure with two-floor annexes in all the corners of the building. Subcupola space predominates in the interiors of both churches, which is reflected in the exterior shapes of these structures.

Gallery

See also 
 Hovhannavank

References

External links 

Oriental Orthodox congregations established in the 13th century
Christian monasteries in Armenia
Christian monasteries established in the 13th century
Buildings and structures in Aragatsotn Province